Anastasia Kobekina (born 26 August 1994) is a Russian cellist. In 2019, she won third prize at the 16th International Tchaikovsky Competition.

Life and career 

Kobekina was born in 1994 in Yekaterinburg, Russia, into a family of musicians and received her first cello lessons at the age of four. In 2006, she was accepted into the Moscow Conservatory and in 2016 continued her education with Jens Peter Maintz at the Berlin University of the Arts. She currently studies with Jérôme Pernoo at the Conservatoire de Paris and at the Frankfurt University of Music and Performing Arts with Kristin von der Goltz.

She was a finalist at Eurovision Young Musicians 2008. In 2019, she won third prize at the 16th International Tchaikovsky Competition.

Kobekina performs on a 1743 cello by Giovanni Battista Guadagnini.

Discography

References 

1994 births
Living people
Russian women classical cellists
21st-century Russian women musicians
Musicians from Yekaterinburg
21st-century cellists